John Ryerson may refer to:

 John K. Ryerson (1820–1890), merchant and politician from Nova Scotia
John Ryerson (tennis) (1862–1910), American tennis player

See also
 John Ryerson Neff (1844–1913), farmer and politician from the Northwest Territories